Chamakunnu is a village in Kerala, India.

Economy
Chamakunnu is known for its varied spice and fruit farms. Included are coconut, paprika and various spices, plantain, tapioca, mangoes, jack fruit, teak, manjium, pineapple, papaya, flowers, kodapulli, vanilla, chickoo and other fruits. Historically, the population of Chamakunnu was primarily made up of farmers, but in modern times, most inhabitants are well-educated, and work both in and outside of the village.

Etymology
While the literal meaning of the place name "kunnu" indicates a mountain or hill, the village lies on a mostly flat region.

Geography

Chamakunnu is located in Vellangallur Panjayath, Thrissur district of Indian state of Kerala.

Worship Places

Ayyappa Temple & St. Antony's Church are the main worship places in Chamakunnu.

St. Antony's Church is the worship place for Christian community in the village, and is under the Irinjalakuda diocese. The "Pindi Perunnal" is a famous festival held each year in January.

Ayyappa Temple is the worship place for the local Hindu community of the village. "Ayyappa Vilakku" is a Hindu festival celebrated annually. The temple is maintained by the Ayyappa Seva Samiti trust.

Photo gallery

References

Villages in Thrissur district